"Harun and Leyla" – is the 6th and the last mugham opera composed by Uzeyir Hajibeyov.

The 5 acted opera was composed in 1915, but was not staged. Libretto of the opera was also written by Uzeyir Hajibeyov, based on an Arabic dastan of the same name.

References

Azerbaijani-language operas
Operas by Uzeyir Hajibeyov
1915 operas
Operas set in the Middle East